Lovci orchidejí is a Czech novel, written by František Flos. It was first published in 1920.

1920 Czech novels